This is the list of notable Indian actresses appears in Indian television Soap Operas.

Hindi

Tamil

Malayalam

Telugu

Kannada

Marathi

Bengali

See also
 List of Indian television actors
 List of Indian film actresses
List of Hindi television actresses

References

 
television actresses